Zhukovsky District is an administrative and municipal district (raion), one of the twenty-seven in Bryansk Oblast, Russia. It is located in the north of the oblast. Its administrative center is the town of Zhukovka. As of the 2021 Census, the total population of the district was 33,943, with the population of Zhukovka accounting for 52.5% of that number.

History
The district was established on June 17, 1929 within Bryansk Okrug of Western Oblast.

References

Notes

Sources

Управление по делам архивов Брянской области. Государственный архив Брянской области. "Административно-территориальное деление Брянского края за 1916–2006 годы" (Administrative-Territorial Division of Bryansk Region in 1916–2006). Том 1. Брянск, 2011.

Districts of Bryansk Oblast
States and territories established in 1929
